GrandPerspective is open source software for Mac OS X used for disk space analysis in a graphical treemap. The application was ranked #6 in the "50 Mac Essentials" list by Cult of Mac in 2010. After fifteen years – with the release of version 2.5.4 – a new application icon was introduced to reflect macOS Big Sur app icon guidelines.

References

External links
GrandPerspective site

Disk usage analysis software
MacOS-only free software